Mokrous is an urban locality (a work settlement) and the administrative center of Fyodorovsky District of Saratov Oblast, Russia. Population:

References

Urban-type settlements in Saratov Oblast